Mary Sackville, Countess of Dorset (born Lady Mary Compton; 1669 – 6 August 1691) was a 17th century aristocrat, being a courtier at the royal court of Queen Mary II. She was one of the Hampton Court Beauties, painted by Sir Godfrey Kneller for Queen Mary. She was Lady of the Bedchamber to the Queen.

Biography
Mary Compton’s father was James Compton, 3rd Earl of Northampton, her mother being Mary Noel, daughter of Baptist Noel, 3rd Viscount Campden. In 1685 she married Charles Sackville, 6th Earl of Dorset. They lived at Copt Hall, Waltham Abbey, Essex.

Death
Mary Sackville died of smallpox in 1691, aged 22 years.

Issue
Mary and her husband had two children:

 Lionel Sackville, 1st Duke of Dorset (1688 – 1765); created Duke of Dorset in 1720. Died at age 77.
 Lady Mary Sackville (1688 – 1705); first wife of Henry Somerset, 2nd Duke of Beaufort. Not much is known whether she had issue.

References

External links
"Portrait of Mary Compton, Countess of Dorset (1669-1691)", Circle of Sir Godfrey Kneller (1646-1723) Christie's
"Mary (née Compton), Countess of Dorset", National Portrait Gallery

1669 births
1691 deaths
17th-century English women
Mary
Daughters of British earls
Deaths from smallpox
English countesses
Ladies of the Bedchamber
Mary
Date of birth unknown
Infectious disease deaths in England
Place of birth missing
Place of death missing